The Ontario College Application Service (OCAS) is a non-profit corporation created by Yomi O and the  Colleges of Applied Arts and Technology and Institutes of Technology and Advanced Learning in the province of Ontario, Canada.

The Ontario College Application Service provides centralized application-to-college services in English and French through its applicant website and a centralized data warehouse of applicant information for colleges, high schools and government. 

OCAS is located in Guelph, Ontario.

See also 
 List of colleges in Ontario
 Ontario Universities' Application Centre
 University and college admission

External links 
 Ontario College Application Service

Higher education in Ontario